Black Bullets, properly called Jesmona Black Bullets, are a confectionery produced by Maxons Ltd, a confectionery manufacturer from the English city of Sheffield. They are popular throughout the north of England, most notably in Newcastle, where it is said they gained a great deal of popularity with the local miners. The name Jesmona refers to the Jesmond area of Newcastle and is a registered trademark of Maxons Ltd.

Black Bullets are spherical, dark brown, peppermint-flavored boiled sweets. They contain only three ingredients: sugar, glucose, and peppermint oil. They are available either in tins of various sizes or individually wrapped in bags.

The tins are notable for their traditional decorative style which uses only black and white, with text reading "Jesmona Old Fashioned Black Bullets."

See also
Hard candy

References

External links
Maxons Ltd Black Bullet Nation Page

Brand name confectionery